M. A. Mannan M.P (born 16 February 1946) is a Bangladeshi politician and the Minister of Planning of Bangladesh since 2019. Mr Mannan was a former diplomat and bureaucrat of Bangladesh who served to the Government Bangladesh.

Early life 
Mannan was born on 16 February 1946 in Dungria, Sunamganj, Sylhet District, Assam Province, British India. He finished his O-level at the PAF Public School Sargodha in Punjab, Pakistan. He graduated from the University of Dhaka.

Career 
In 1974, he joined the Government service as a BCS cadre. He served as the Deputy Commissioner of Kishorgonj District,  Director General of NGO Affairs Bureau, Joint Secretary (Political) in Ministry of Home Affairs, Director General in the Prime Minister's office, Chairman of Bangladesh Small and Cottage Industries Corporation, and the Economic Minister at the Bangladesh Permanent Mission in Geneva.

In 2005, he joined the Bangladesh Awami League. He was elected to the 9th parliament in 2008 from Sunamganj-3. He was the chairman of the Parliamentary Standing Committee of Public Accounts. He was a member of the Parliamentary Standing Committee of Ministry of Finance,  Parliamentary Standing Committee of Ministry of Defense, and the Parliamentary Standing Committee of Ministry of Public Administration. In 2010, he was elected to the central Executive Committee of Bangladesh Awami League and re-elected in 2013. He was made the State Minister of Finance on 12 January 2014. He was also made the State Minister of Planning in April 2014.

Personal life 
Mannan is married to Zolekha Mannan, a college professor. His son is settled in the United Kingdom and his daughter is settled in the United States.

References 

Living people
University of Dhaka alumni
Awami League politicians
State Ministers of Finance (Bangladesh)
State Ministers of Planning (Bangladesh)
People from Dakshin Sunamganj Upazila
PAF College Sargodha alumni
9th Jatiya Sangsad members
11th Jatiya Sangsad members
Planning ministers of Bangladesh
10th Jatiya Sangsad members
1946 births
Murari Chand College alumni